Budrus is a Palestinian village in the Ramallah and al-Bireh Governorate, located 31 kilometers northwest of Ramallah in the northern West Bank. According to the Palestinian Central Bureau of Statistics (PCBS), the village had a population of 1,399 inhabitants in 2007.

Location
It is bordered by Qibya and Ni'lin to the east, Qibya  to the north, the Green line to the west, and Ni'lin to the south.

History
"Budrus" is Arabic for "Peter" and in ancient times the village was known as Patris. The site of the modern village is just east of the 1949 armistice line, while the ancient village was probably 2 km away at Khirbet Budrus, on the west side of the line. It was mentioned in the Jewish Tosefta (Demai 1) as being included in the boundary of the southern mountains of Judea.

Archeological remains from the     Hellenistic and the Byzantine eras have been found.

Ottoman era
In 1596, Budrus appeared in Ottoman  tax registers as being in the Nahiya of Ramla of the Liwa of Gaza. It had a population of 46 Muslim households and paid taxes on wheat, barley, olives or summer crops, goats or beehives and a press for olives or grapes; a total of 3,608 akçe. 7/24 of the revenue went to a Waqf.

In 1838, Budrus was counted as a Muslim village in the Gaza District, noted from the tower of the White Mosque of Ramleh.

In 1870, Victor Guérin saw Budrus from a distance, situated on a high hill. He was told that to the west of this village, on a neighboring hill, there were ruins with the name of Khirbet Budrus.  An official Ottoman village list from about the same year, 1870, showed that Ebdus had a total of 28 houses and a population of 93, though the population count included only men. It also noted that it was located by Qibya and Ni'lin.

In 1882, PEF's Survey of Western Palestine described Budrus as "a small village, with olive-groves and cisterns. It has near it two sacred places (maqams), and a graveyard near one (Imam 'Aly) on the west."

British Mandate era
In the 1922 census of Palestine conducted by the British Mandate authorities, Budrus had a population of 334; all Muslims, increasing in the 1931 census to 430 Muslims in a total of 98 houses.

In the 1945 statistics the population was 510, all Muslims, while the total land area was 7,935 dunams, according to an official land and population survey. Of this, 636 dunums were plantation or irrigated, 2,412 were allotted to cereals, while 19 dunams were built-up (urban) areas.

Jordanian era
In the wake of the 1948 Arab–Israeli War, and after the 1949 Armistice Agreements, Budrus came under Jordanian rule.

The Jordanian census of 1961 found 776 inhabitants in Budrus.

1967-present

Since the Six-Day War in 1967, Budrus   has been under Israeli occupation.

After the 1995 accords, 11.2% of  Budrus’s land was classified as Area B, the remaining 88.8% as Area C. Israel has confiscated land from Budrus for the construction of the Israeli West Bank barrier, surrounding the village to the north and west, cutting off many villagers from their land. Frequent protests against the wall have occurred since 2003.
A boy from the village, 16-year-old Samir Awad, was shot to death in February 2013 near the Israeli West Bank barrier, where he reportedly had gone with friends to throw stones at soldiers. According to an investigation by B'tselem, he was shot while fleeing, once in the leg, and then further, while attempting to run away, once in the back and the head. A military investigation made a preliminary finding that the soldiers had fired  in contravention of open-fire regulations. The house of his family was later subject to assault with concussion grenades, injuring several members, while another son, Abed, was arrested and taken to an unknown destination. In 2018, the Israeli prosecution decided not to charge the Israeli soldiers involved.

See also
 Budrus  - a film about the non-violent protests of Budrus residents against the building of the Israeli West Bank barrier in the village.

Footnotes

Bibliography

External links
Welcome To Budrus
Survey of Western Palestine, Map 14:  IAA, Wikimedia commons 
 Budrus Village (Fact Sheet),  Applied Research Institute–Jerusalem (ARIJ)
 Budrus Village Profile, ARIJ
 Budrus aerial photo, ARIJ
 Locality Development Priorities and Needs in Budrus Village, ARIJ  
Israel illegally Re delineate the boundaries of the Palestinian Villages! The case of Qibya and Budrus villages 17, October, 2005

Villages in the West Bank
Ramallah and al-Bireh Governorate
Municipalities of the State of Palestine